Zapata usually refers to Emiliano Zapata, a Mexican revolutionary. It may also refer to:

People 
 Zapata (surname)

Birds
 Zapata rail
 Zapata sparrow
 Zapata wren

Places 
 Ciénaga de Zapata, municipality in Cuba
 Zapata Peninsula, peninsula in Cuba
 Zapata Swamp, Cuba
 Zapata County, Texas
 Zapata, Texas

Films
 Viva Zapata!, a 1952 movie based on the life of Emiliano Zapata
 Zapata: The Dream of a Hero, a Mexican movie about Emiliano Zapata
 Zapata Western, a subgenre of Westerns and Spaghetti Westerns set during the Mexican Revolution era

Other 
 Zapata Corporation, founded by George H. W. Bush
 Operation Zapata, code name for the failed CIA-backed Bay of Pigs Invasion Cuban exile training program
 Zapata metro station, a Mexico City Metro station
 Zapata Formation, geological formation in Patagonia

Artworks 
 Zapata (lithograph) created by Diego Rivera in 1932

See also
 Zapatista (disambiguation)
 Emiliano Zapata (disambiguation)